Falaniko "Niko" Vitale is a retired American mixed martial artist. He competed in the Middleweight division and has fought in the UFC, Bellator, Strikeforce, the IFL, and King of the Cage. He is a former SuperBrawl Middleweight Champion, and also won the X-1 Middleweight Tournament.

Background
Vitale was born in Honolulu, Hawaii and is a native of Waipahu, Hawaii. He is of mixed Samoan, Chinese, German, and Portuguese descent. He graduated from Waipahu High School and was a star defensive back in football, going on to play for the University of Hawaii.

Mixed martial arts career

Early career
Vitale made his professional debut in 1999 against future UFC veteran Aaron Riley and won via TKO. Vitale would then go on to win his next three fights, his fourth career bout being his King of the Cage debut, before being handed his first professional loss by Japanese fighter Yasuhito Namekawa by a guillotine choke submission in the RINGS organization. He compiled a career record of 13–2 with only one fight outside of his Hawaii (his King of the Cage debut in California) before making his UFC debut.

UFC
Vitale made his UFC debut at UFC 43 against Olympic wrestler Matt Lindland in Nevada and won in a spectacular and very unusual slam knockout in which Lindland attempted to slam Vitale but landed on his own head knocking himself out. Vitale then mounted Lindland and the referee stopped the match. Two fights later, the two would have a rematch at UFC 45, which would result in a loss for Vitale after he submitted due to strikes.

Post-UFC
In his next fight Vitale bounced back with a win over former UFC Middleweight Champion Dave Menne via unanimous decision. Two fights later, Vitale defeated future UFC veteran Yushin Okami via split decision.

Vitale had a five-fight winning streak before losing three consecutive fights to Robbie Lawler, Jason "Mayhem" Miller, and then lost in the rematch with Lawler.

Vitale bounced back with a win but then lost again in his IFL debut in Oakland, California against Jeremy Horn via split decision.

Strikeforce
Three fights after his loss to Horn, Vitale made his Strikeforce debut, winning after his opponent submitted due to strikes. In his next fight under the Strikeforce banner, Vitale lost to Trevor Prangley via referee decision. Three fights later, Vitale returned in a bout against Frank Trigg which he lost via unanimous decision.

Bellator
On January 28, 2011, Vitale signed a long-term deal with Bellator. He lost his debut fight against former Middleweight Champion Hector Lombard in a non-title fight.

King of the Cage
Vitale would return over a year later against Elmer Waterhen at KOTC - Ali'is on July 14, 2012. Vitale won via TKO in the first round.

Vitale faced Jaime Jara at X-1 - Jara vs. Vitale on September 26, 2014. He lost the bout via second-round submission and subsequently retired from mixed martial arts.

Personal life
Vitale is married and has four children. He and his family are Christians.

Mixed martial arts record

|-
| Loss
| align=center| 30–11
| Jaime Jara
| Submission (rear-naked choke)
| X-1: Jara vs. Vitale
| 
| align=center| 2
| align=center| N/A
| Honolulu, Hawaii, United States
| 
|-
| Win
| align=center| 30–10
| Elmer Waterhen
| TKO (punches)
| KOTC: Ali'is
| 
| align=center| 1
| align=center| 3:36
| Honolulu, Hawaii, United States
| 
|-
| Loss
| align=center| 29–10
| Hector Lombard
| KO (punch)
| Bellator 44
| 
| align=center| 3
| align=center| 0:54
| Atlantic City, New Jersey, United States
| 
|-
| Win
| align=center| 29–9
| Dylan Clay
| KO (punch)
| X-1 Events: Champions III
| 
| align=center| 1
| align=center| 3:04
| Hawaii, United States
|Won the X-1 Middleweight Championship.
|-
| Win
| align=center| 28–9
| Kala Hose
| Submission (ezekiel choke)
| X-1 Events: Heroes
| 
| align=center| 4
| align=center| 2:26
| Hawaii, United States
| 
|-
| Win
| align=center| 27–9
| Kalib Starnes
| Submission (ezekiel choke)
| X-1 Events: Champions II
| 
| align=center| 1
| align=center| 2:22
| Hawaii, United States
| 
|-
| Loss
| align=center| 26–9
| Frank Trigg
| Decision (unanimous)
| Strikeforce: Payback
| 
| align=center| 3
| align=center| 5:00
| Colorado, United States
| 
|-
| Win
| align=center| 26–8
| Ricky Shivers
| TKO (cut)
| X-1 Events: Champions
| 
| align=center| 1
| align=center| 0:49
| Hawaii, United States
|Won the X-1 Middleweight Tournament.
|-
| Win
| align=center| 25–8
| Joey Guel
| Decision (unanimous)
| X-1 Events: Champions
| 
| align=center| 3
| 
| Hawaii, United States
| 
|-
| Loss
| align=center| 24–8
| Trevor Prangley
| Decision (referee decision)
| Strikeforce: Four Men Enter, One Man Survives
| 
| align=center| 2
| align=center| 2:12
| California, United States
| 
|-
| Win
| align=center| 24–7
| Ron Fields
| Submission (strikes)
| Strikeforce: Playboy Mansion
| 
| align=center| 1
| align=center| 3:02
| California, United States
|Catchweight (195 lbs) bout.
|-
| Win
| align=center| 23–7
| Steve Renaud
| Submission (strikes)
| X-1: Grand Prix 2007
| 
| align=center| 1
| align=center| 0:43
| Hawaii, United States
| 
|-
| Win
| align=center| 22–7
| Mavrick Harvey
| TKO (submission to strikes)
| X-1: Extreme Fighting 2
| 
| align=center| 1
| align=center| 2:41
| Hawaii, United States
|Light Heavyweight bout.
|-
| Loss
| align=center| 21–7
| Jeremy Horn
| Decision (split)
| IFL: Oakland
| 
| align=center| 5
| align=center| 4:00
| California, United States
| 
|-
| Win
| align=center| 21–6
| Tony Williams
| KO
| Extreme Wars 5: Battlegrounds
| 
| align=center| 1
| align=center| 2:48
| Hawaii, United States
|Light Heavyweight bout.
|-
| Loss
| align=center| 20–6
| Robbie Lawler
| KO (punches)
| Icon Sport: Lawler vs. Niko 2
| 
| align=center| 1
| align=center| 3:38
| Hawaii, United States
| 
|-
| Loss
| align=center| 20–5
| Jason Miller
| Submission (rear naked choke)
| Icon Sport: Opposites Attract
| 
| align=center| 2
| align=center| 2:41
| Hawaii, United States
| 
|-
| Loss
| align=center| 20–4
| Robbie Lawler
| KO (punches)
| Superbrawl: Icon
| 
| align=center| 2
| align=center| 4:36
| Hawaii, United States
| 
|-
| Win
| align=center| 20–3
| Masanori Suda
| KO (punch)
| SB 39: Destiny
| 
| align=center| 1
| align=center| 4:07
| Hawaii, United States
| 
|-
| Win
| align=center| 19–3
| Ron Fields
| Submission (heel hook)
| SuperBrawl 38
| 
| align=center| 1
| align=center| 3:48
| Hawaii, United States
|Light Heavyweight bout.
|-
| Win
| align=center| 18–3
| Yushin Okami
| Decision (split)
| SuperBrawl 36
| 
| align=center| 3
| align=center| 5:00
| Hawaii, United States
| 
|-
| Win
| align=center| 17–3
| Keith Winters
| Submission (toe hold)
| SuperBrawl 34
| 
| align=center| 1
| align=center| 1:24
| Hawaii, United States
|Light Heavyweight bout.
|-
| Win
| align=center| 16–3
| Dave Menne
| Decision (unanimous)
| SuperBrawl 33
| 
| align=center| 3
| align=center| 5:00
| Hawaii, United States
| 
|-
| Loss
| align=center| 15–3
| Matt Lindland
| TKO (submission to strikes)
| UFC 45
| 
| align=center| 3
| align=center| 4:23
| Connecticut, United States
| 
|-
| Win
| align=center| 15–2
| Justin Ellison
| KO
| SuperBrawl 31
| 
| align=center| 1
| align=center| 2:35
| Hawaii, United States
| 
|-
| Win
| align=center| 14–2
| Matt Lindland
| KO (slam)
| UFC 43
| 
| align=center| 1
| align=center| 1:56
| Nevada, United States
| 
|-
| Win
| align=center| 13–2
| Tyrone Roberts
| Submission (toe hold)
| SuperBrawl 28
| 
| align=center| 2
| align=center| 1:26
| Hawaii, United States
| 
|-
| Win
| align=center| 12–2
| Sean McCully
| Submission
| SuperBrawl 27
| 
| align=center| 1
| align=center| 0:51
| Hawaii, United States
| 
|-
| Win
| align=center| 11–2
| Pascal Gosselin
| Submission (armbar)
| UCC Hawaii: Eruption in Hawaii
| 
| align=center| 1
| align=center| 2:00
| Hawaii, United States
| 
|-
| Win
| align=center| 10–2
| Charlie Wesr
| Submission (toe hold)
| Force Fighting Championships 1
| 
| align=center| 2
| align=center| 1:15
| Hawaii, United States
| 
|-
| Win
| align=center| 9–2
| Jason Drexel
| Submission (kimura)
| SuperBrawl 23
| 
| align=center| 1
| align=center| 3:05
| Hawaii, United States
| 
|-
| Loss
| align=center| 8–2
| Sean Gray
| TKO (punches)
| Warriors Quest 3: Punishment in Paradise
| 
| align=center| 1
| align=center| 3:47
| Hawaii, United States
| 
|-
| Win
| align=center| 8–1
| John Renken
| TKO
| SuperBrawl 22
| 
| align=center| 1
| align=center| 2:29
| Hawaii, United States
| 
|-
| Win
| align=center| 7–1
| Todd Medina
| Decision (unanimous)
| Warriors Quest 1: The New Beginning
| 
| align=center| 3
| align=center| 5:00
| Hawaii, United States
| 
|-
| Win
| align=center| 6–1
| Dennis Reed
| Submission (armbar)
| SuperBrawl 21
| 
| align=center| 1
| align=center| 0:43
| Hawaii, United States
|Return to Middleweight.
|-
| Win
| align=center| 5–1
| Ricardo Barros
| TKO
| Warriors of the New Millennium 2
| 
| align=center| 1
| align=center| 3:44
| Hawaii, United States
| 
|-
| Loss
| align=center| 4–1
| Yasuhito Namekawa
| Submission (guillotine choke)
| RINGS USA: Rising Stars Block B
| 
| align=center| 2
| align=center| 0:27
| Hawaii, United States
|Light Heavyweight debut.
|-
| Win
| align=center| 4–0
| Aaron Torres
| Submission (armbar)
| KOTC 4: Gladiators
| 
| align=center| 1
| align=center| 2:21
| California, United States
| 
|-
| Win
| align=center| 3–0
| Ahmad Reese
| TKO (submission to strikes)
| Rage in the Cage 3
| 
| align=center| 1
| align=center| 1:41
| Hawaii, United States
| 
|-
| Win
| align=center| 2–0
| Phil Ortiz
| Submission (armbar)
| SuperBrawl 15
| 
| align=center| 1
| align=center| 2:39
| Hawaii, United States
| 
|-
| Win
| align=center| 1–0
| Aaron Riley
| TKO
| RITC 2: Marching of the Warriors
| 
| align=center| 1
| align=center| 7:06
| Hawaii, United States
|

References

External links

 

Samoan male mixed martial artists
American male mixed martial artists
Mixed martial artists from Hawaii
Middleweight mixed martial artists
Living people
Sportspeople from Honolulu
1974 births
Ultimate Fighting Championship male fighters
American Christians